Sybrand Engelbrecht may refer to:

Sybrand Engelbrecht (cricketer)
Sybrand Engelbrecht (soldier), South African military commander